Wigan Athletic Football Club is a professional football team based in Wigan, Greater Manchester. The club was formed in 1932, and joined the Football League in 1978. Wigan Athletic currently compete in the third tier of English football, the EFL League One.

Club records

Matches

Firsts
 First competitive match: Wigan Athletic 0–2 Port Vale Reserves, Cheshire League, 27 August 1932. 
 First FA Cup match: Wigan Athletic 1–1 Great Harwood, preliminary round, 16 September 1933.
 First Northern Premier League match: Scarborough 0–2 Wigan Athletic, 10 August 1968.
 First Football League match: Hereford United 0–0 Wigan Athletic, 19 August 1978.

Record results
 Record win: 14–0 against Chorley (pre-season friendly) 1 August 2017
 Record Football League win: 8–0 v Hull City, Championship, 14 July 2020.
 Record Football League defeat: 1–9 v Tottenham Hotspur, Premier League, 2009.

Attendances
 Highest attendance (Springfield Park): 27,526 v Hereford United, FA Cup, 1953.
 Highest attendance (DW Stadium): 25,133 v Manchester United, Premier League, May 2008.

Player records

Appearances
 Youngest player ever : Jensen Weir, aged 15 years, on 7 November 2017.
 Oldest player ever: Dave Beasant, 43 years, 235 days, v Doncaster Rovers, 12 November 2002.
 Most League appearances: Kevin Langley, 317, 1981–1986 & 1990–1994.
 Most consecutive League appearances: Jimmy Bullard, 123, January 2003 to December 2005.

Goalscorers
 Most goals in the League: 70, Andy Liddell, 1998–2004.
 Most League goals scored in a season: 31, Graeme Jones, 1996–97.
Most goals in the Premiership: 24, Hugo Rodallega, 2009–2012.
Most goals at the DW Stadium: 41, Nathan Ellington, 2002–2005.

Transfer fees
 Highest transfer fee paid: Charles N'Zogbia, £7 million, February 2009.
 Highest transfer fee received: Antonio Valencia, £15 million, June 2009.

Progressive record fees paid

Progressive record fees received

Notes

A.  Wigan paid Newcastle United £6 million for N'Zogbia, with Ryan Taylor (valued at £1 million) transferring to Newcastle in a part-exchange deal.

References
General
 

Specific

Records and Statistics
Wigan Athletic